is a Japanese scenario writer. He is known for his work on Digimon Frontier, Gall Force, Genesis Climber MOSPEADA, Mobile Suit Victory Gundam, Sailor Moon, Macross II, B't X and Wedding Peach.

Screenwriting

Anime television series
 series head writer denoted in bold
Ganso Tensai Bakabon (1977)
Cho Super Car Gattaiger (1977-1978)
Gekisou! Rubenkaiser (1977-1978)
Majokko Tickle (1978)
Starzinger (1978-1979)
Megaloman (1979)
Invincible Robo Trider G7 (1980)
King Arthur (1980)
Space Runaway Ideon (1980-1981)
Fisherman Sanpei (1980-1982)
Saikyo Robo Daioja (1981)
Dotakon (1981)
GoShogun (1981)
Galaxy Cyclone Braiger (1981)
Dash Kappei (1982)
Fang of the Sun Dougram (1982-1983)
Super Dimension Fortress Macross (1982-1983)
Love Me, My Knight (1983)
Mirai Keisatsu Urashiman (1983)
Super Dimension Century Orguss (1983-1984)
Aura Battler Dunbine (1983-1984)
Genesis Climber MOSPEADA (1983-1984)
Heavy Metal L-Gaim (1984-1985)
Persia, the Magic Fairy (1984-1985)
Wing-Man (1984-1985)
Futari Daka (1984-1985)
Alpen Rose (1985)
Ninja Senshi Tobikage (1985-1986)
Ganbare, Kickers! (1986)
Kimagure Orange Road (1987-1988)
Mami the Psychic (1987-1989)
Bikkuriman (1987-1989)
Osomatsu-kun (1988)
Shin Bikkuriman (1989-1990)
Dragon Quest: Legend of the Hero Abel (1989-1991)
Tasuke, the Samurai Cop (1990-1991)
RPG Densetsu Hepoi (1990-1991)
Genji Tsūshin Agedama (1991)
High School Mystery: Gakuen Nanafushigi (1991-1992)
Sailor Moon (1992-1993)
Yu Yu Hakusho (1992-1994)
Mobile Suit Victory Gundam (1993-1994)
Sailor Moon R (1993-1994)
Sailor Moon S (1994-1995)
Macross 7 (1994-1995)
Ping-Pong Club (1995)
Wedding Peach (1995-1996)
B't X (1996)
Baby & Me (1996)
Jigoku Sensei Nūbē (1996-1997)
The Legend of Zorro (1996-1997)
Hyper Police (1997)
Anime Ganbare Goemon (1998)
Weiß Kreuz (1998)
Yoiko (1998-1999)
Power Stone (1999)
Burst Ball Barrage!! Super B-Daman (1999)
Phantom Thief Jeanne (1999-2000)
Ceres, Celestial Legend (2000)
Gear Fighter Dendoh (2000)
Salaryman Kintarō (2001)
Digimon Frontier (2002-2003)
Ki Fighter Taerang (2002-2003)
Firestorm (2003)
Pluster World (2003-2004)
Full-Blast Science Adventure - So That’s How It Is (2003-2004)
Agatha Christie’s Great Detectives Poirot and Marple (2004-2005)
The Snow Queen (2005)
Crash B-Daman (2006)
Happy Lucky Bikkuriman (2006-2007)
Shōwa Monogatari (2011)

Live action TV
 Kamen Rider Super-1 (1981)
 Hana no Asuka-gumi! (1988)

Films
 The Ideon: Be Invoked (1982)
 Dougram: Documentary of the Fang of the Sun (1983)
 Macross: Do You Remember Love? (1984)
 Utsunomiko (1989)
 Utsunomiko 2: Tenjohen (1990)
 Jigoku Sensei Nūbē (1996)

OVAs
 series head writer denoted in bold
 Gall Force: Eternal Story (1986)
 Outlanders (1986)
 Elf 17 (1987)
 Cleopatra DC (1989)
 Hi-Speed Jecy (1989-1990)
 Devil Hunter Yohko (1990)
 Super Dimensional Fortress Macross II: Lovers Again (1992)
 Dokyusei: End of Summer (1994-1995)
 Fencer of Minerva (1995)
 Macross Dynamite 7 (1997-1998)

Manga
 Super Dimensional Fortress Macross II: Lovers Again (1993)
 Wedding Peach (1994-1996)
Baby Birth (2001-2002)

References

External links
 
 
 Sukehiro Tomita anime at Media Arts Database 
 Sukehiro Tomita at WikiMoon

1948 births
Japanese screenwriters
Anime screenwriters
Anime and manga critics
Living people